Xiao may refer to:

 Filial piety, or "being good to parents", a virtue in Chinese culture
 Xiao (flute), a Chinese end-blown flute
 Xiao (rank), a rank used for field officers in the Chinese military
 Xiao County, in Anhui, China
 Xiao Mountain, a range of mountains in Henan, China, or the surrounding Xiao region
 Xiao River, a tributary of the Xiang River, in Hunan, China
 Xiao (mythology), certain legendary creatures in Chinese mythology
 Ling Xiaoyu, a character from the Tekken video game series, also known as Xiao

People
 Xiao (surname), a Chinese surname sometimes also romanized as Hsiao, Siaw, Siew, Siow, Seow, Siu or Sui
 Duke Xiao of Qin, Chinese ruler of the state of Qin
 Prince Xiao of Liang, the posthumous title of Liu Wu, younger brother of the Han emperor Jing
 Empress Dowager Xiaozhuang (1613–1688), empress dowager of the Qing Dynasty
 Xiao Guodong (born 1989), Chinese professional snooker player
 Xiao He, first chancellor of the Han Dynasty
 Xiao Hong (1911–1942), Chinese writer
 Xiao Jianhua (born c. 1972), Chinese-Canadian businessman
 Xiao Qian (1910–1999), Chinese essayist
 Xiao Qiang, Chinese human rights activist
 Xiao Qiao, the younger of the Qiao sisters
 Xiao Zhan (born 1991), a member of C-pop group XNINE and a Chinese actor
 Xiao De Jun (Xiao Jun) (born 1999), a member of C-Pop group WayV

Other
 Xiao Xiao, cartoons by Zhu Zhiqiang
 Xiao Jing, the Chinese name of the Classic of Filial Piety
 Xiao, A fictional character in the game Genshin Impact